Therma, also known as Loutra, is a village located on the northern side of Samothrace island, Greece.

Demographics
As of 2011, Therma had a registered population of 106.

Tourism
Therma is a popular tourist destination. It is known for its hot springs, from which it derives its names. There are also many nearby canyons that are popular with tourists. The summit of Fengari can be reached via a hiking trail from Therma.

References

Populated places in Samothrace